The 2017 AFC Cup qualifying play-offs were played from 30 January to 28 February 2017. A total of 14 teams competed in the qualifying play-offs to decide five of the 34 places in the group stage of the 2017 AFC Cup.

Teams
The following 14 teams, split into five zones (West Asia Zone, Central Asia Zone, South Asia Zone, ASEAN Zone, East Asia Zone), entered the qualifying play-offs, consisting of two rounds:
8 teams entered in the preliminary round.
6 teams entered in the play-off round.

Originally 17 teams entered the qualifying play-offs (10 entered in the preliminary round, 7 entered in the play-off round) before the withdrawal of teams in the East Asia Zone.

Format

In the qualifying play-offs, each tie was played on a home-and-away two-legged basis. The away goals rule, extra time (away goals would not apply in extra time) and penalty shoot-out were used to decide the winner if necessary (Regulations Article 9.3). The five winners of the play-off round advanced to the group stage to join the 29 direct entrants.

Schedule
The schedule of each round was as follows (W: West Asia Zone; C: Central Asia Zone; S: South Asia Zone; A: ASEAN Zone).

Bracket

The bracket of the qualifying play-offs for each zone was determined by the AFC based on the association ranking of each team, with the team from the higher-ranked association hosting the second leg. Teams from the same association in the ASEAN Zone could not be placed into the same play-off.

Play-off West Asia
 Al-Suwaiq advanced to Group A.

Play-off Central Asia
 Dordoi advanced to Group D.

Play-off South Asia
 Mohun Bagan advanced to Group E.

Play-off ASEAN 1
 Home United advanced to Group H.

Play-off ASEAN 2
 Boeung Ket Angkor advanced to Group F.

Play-off East Asia
The East Asia Zone qualifying play-offs were not played due to the withdrawal of teams.
 Kigwancha advanced directly to Group I after Rovers (Guam) withdrew from the group stage.
 Erchim advanced directly to Group I after Taipower and Tatung (both Chinese Taipei) withdrew from the group stage and qualifying play-offs respectively.

Preliminary round
A total of 8 teams played in the preliminary round.

l
|+Central Asia Zone

|+South Asia Zone

Central Asia Zone

Khosilot won 1–0 on aggregate.

Dordoi won 3–2 on aggregate.

South Asia Zone

Mohun Bagan won 4–2 on aggregate.

Club Valencia won 3–0 on aggregate.

Play-off round
A total of 10 teams played in the play-off round: 6 teams which entered in this round, and 4 winners of the preliminary round.

|+West Asia Zone

|+Central Asia Zone

|+South Asia Zone

|+ASEAN Zone

West Asia Zone

Al-Suwaiq won 4–3 on aggregate.

Central Asia Zone

Dordoi won 2–1 on aggregate.

South Asia Zone

Mohun Bagan won 5–2 on aggregate.

ASEAN Zone

Home United won 7–3 on aggregate.

Boeung Ket Angkor won 2–1 on aggregate.

Notes

References

External links
, the-AFC.com
AFC Cup 2017, stats.the-AFC.com

1
January 2017 sports events in Asia
February 2017 sports events in Asia